Jack Wheeler may refer to:
John P. "Jack" Wheeler III (1944–2010), presidential aide to Ronald Reagan, George H.W. Bush and George W. Bush
Jack Wheeler (footballer, born 1919) (1919–2009), English football goalkeeper
Jack Wheeler (American football) (1908–1990), American football player
John Neville Wheeler (1886–1973), John Neville "Jack" Wheeler, American publishing executive
Jack Wheeler, real name of the DC Comics character Wild Dog

See also
John Wheeler (disambiguation)